Khvoshabad (also Romanized as Khvoshābād and Khowshābād; also known as Khosh Abad and Khushāba) is a village in Mohr Rural District, in the Central District of Mohr County, Fars Province, Iran. At the 2006 census, its population was 139, in 29 families.

References 

Populated places in Mohr County